Jasmin Čeliković (born 7 January 1999) is a Bosnian professional footballer who plays as a centre back for Bosnian Premier League club Tuzla City. He also played for the Bosnia and Herzegovina U21 national team.

Čeliković started his professional career at Rijeka, who loaned him to Inter Zaprešić in 2018 and to Zrinjski Mostar in 2019. The club later loaned him to Sereď and Željezničar.

Club career

Early career
Čeliković started playing football at local clubs, before joining Rijeka's youth academy in 2015. He made his professional debut against Split on 11 December 2016 at the age of 17.

In June 2018, Čeliković was sent on a season-long loan to Inter Zaprešić.

In June 2019, he was loaned to Bosnian side Zrinjski Mostar until the end of season. After Zrinjski, Čeliković was loaned out to Fortuna Liga club ŠKF Sereď. In January 2021, he was sent on a six-month-long loan to Bosnian club Željezničar.

International career
Čeliković represented Bosnia and Herzegovina on all youth levels. He also served as captain of country's all youth selections.

Career statistics

Club

Honours
Rijeka
1. HNL: 2016–17
Croatian Cup: 2019–20

References

External links

1999 births
Living people
People from Bihać
Bosniaks of Bosnia and Herzegovina
Bosnia and Herzegovina Muslims
Bosnia and Herzegovina footballers
Bosnia and Herzegovina youth international footballers
Bosnia and Herzegovina under-21 international footballers
Bosnia and Herzegovina expatriate footballers
Association football central defenders
HNK Rijeka players
NK Inter Zaprešić players
HŠK Zrinjski Mostar players
ŠKF Sereď players
FK Željezničar Sarajevo players
Croatian Football League players
Slovak Super Liga players
Premier League of Bosnia and Herzegovina players
Expatriate footballers in Croatia
Bosnia and Herzegovina expatriate sportspeople in Croatia
Expatriate footballers in Slovakia
Bosnia and Herzegovina expatriate sportspeople in Slovakia